The Szaraz SD-1A Daphne is a homebuilt aircraft that was designed for efficiency competitions.

Design
The Daphne is a two place side-by-side configuration strut-braced high-wing, conventional landing gear equipped homebuilt. The fuselage uses welded steel tubing with aircraft fabric covering. The wings are wood, with one-piece plywood ribs. Both ailerons and flaperons have been installed on the design.

Operational history
The first three examples were built on the same jigs at Art Szaraz's workshop. According to Jane's AWA, by January 1970, at least 26 were under construction.

Specifications (SD-1A Daphne)

See also

References

Homebuilt aircraft
Single-engined tractor aircraft
High-wing aircraft
Aircraft first flown in 1963
United States sport aircraft